Tema, was according to the Bible the ninth son of Ishmael
 
The name Tema or Te'ma or  Tema' (תֵּימָא or תֵּמָא] means the South. The name is rendered  and Thema in Latin,

The name also applied to the name of the tribe that were descended from him and the district they lived in.

References

 

Arab history
Book of Genesis people
Ishmaelites